Norm Cashin (15 July 1915 – 21 July 1969) was a former Australian rules footballer who played with Carlton in the Victorian Football League (VFL).

Notes

External links 

Norm Cashin's profile at Blueseum

1915 births
1969 deaths
Carlton Football Club players
Australian rules footballers from Victoria (Australia)